Noakes is a surname of English origin. It means "near the oaks". Notable people with the surname include:

Andrew Noakes, British academic and writer
Benedict Grant Noakes (born 1965), British television producer
Catherine Noakes, British engineer
Chris Noakes (born 1985), New Zealand rugby union player
David Noakes (born 1953), English businessman and political candidate
Edward Noakes (1863–1944), English clergyman
George Noakes (1924–2008), Bishop of St Davids and Archbishop of Wales
John Noakes (1934–2017), British actor, presenter and television personality
John Noakes (cricketer) (1802–1840), English cricketer
Kim Noakes (born 1982), New Zealand field hockey player
Michael Noakes (1933–2018), English artist and portrait painter
Rab Noakes (1947–2022), Scottish singer-songwriter
Ray Noakes (1906–1928), executed for the murder of Fred N. Selak, the Hermit of Grand Lake, Colorado
Roy Noakes (1936–2002), British sculptor
Sheila Noakes, Baroness Noakes (born 1949), British Conservative politician and former corporate executive
Tim Noakes (born 1949), professor of exercise and sports science at the University of Cape Town
Vivien Noakes (1937–2011), English writer and literary critic

Fictional characters
Camilla "Chummy" Noakes, from the British television series Call the Midwife
John Noakes (pseudonym), or John O'Noakes, or John Nokes, a fictitious name for a person involved in litigation (see John Doe)

See also

Noake (disambiguation)
Nokes (disambiguation)

References

English-language surnames